During the September 11 attacks of 2001, a series of four coordinated terrorist attacks by the Islamic terrorist group al-Qaeda, killed 2,977 people, injured over 6,000, and caused at least $10 billion in infrastructure and property damage. Multiple others have died due to 9/11-related cancer and respiratory diseases in the months and years following the attacks, leading the numbers impacted to continually shift to reflect the new numbers.

Some of the victims were able to document their experiences or the experiences of others and created well known images and video to document the attacks and their trauma. The media produced during and after the attacks were used to help identify victims, for investigations into the attacks and to document the attacks for history amongst other reasons. Many media forms were used, specifically photography and videography from passersby on the streets or surrounding areas, freelance photographers and media crews around the city. The large spread of images and video along with the lasting impact on the population caused many of the images and videos to be in the top of the list of performances given recognition in mid-2002. In broadcast journalism, the Peabody Awards went to ABC and NPR for the channels documentation of the attacks, and the Pulitzer Prizes were awarded to six events around the attacks including two in photography.

Photography 

Due to the public nature of the attack, that occurred in a busy location in broad daylight, the attack on the World Trade Center on 9/11 is said to be the most photographed disaster in history. Potentially due to the sudden and catastrophic nature of the attacks there was no effort by city, state, or federal government to document the disaster. The Mayor of New York City at the time, Rudy Giuliani issued an executive order shortly after the end of the attack, banning amateur photographs of the ruins as it was deemed a "crime scene" and not a tourist attraction. 

Cameras and rolls of film were recovered in the rubble, that were either lost by surviving photographers or near those that lost their lives. These rolls of film and equipment when possible were cleaned and the photos produced to showcase the photographers' final work, notably with the recovered cameras of Bill Biggart. Of the pictures recovered or initially uploaded to company servers, editors had to choose which to include or which would be deemed too disturbing to be published. Of polled photo editors who chose to run images classified as disturbing, for instance those with victims trapped on high levels or falling from the buildings, none chose to run the images on the front page but felt that not running the images would be a disservice to the victims and the scale of the tragedy. One such editor stated: 

Other forms of photo documentation of the disaster were not discovered until much later, such as a man's web-camera that had been set to take multiple photos and had captured the disaster.

Some of these images were incorporated into an exhibition of images called After September 11: Images from Ground Zero which showcased twenty-seven images around the world. Other exhibitions of the images were brought together in the form of archives, such as one spearheaded by photographer Joel Meyerowitz under the direction of the Museum of the City of New York to focus on the rescue and recovery work at Ground Zero.

Well-known images

Videography 
At the beginning of the attacks, there were only three known videographers who captured the impact of the first plane when it hit the North Tower in New York City: a French filmmaker, a German artist, and a Czech tourist. Flight 175's impact of the South Tower was captured by numerous amateur videographers and across multiple news outlets who were reporting on the World Trade Center after Flight 11's impact. Two security cameras captured the impact at The Pentagon and the impact of Flight 93 in Pennsylvania is only recorded as a mushroom cloud in a single video. The attacks were also captured by local law enforcement, such as Officer Glen Pettit who was a video cameraman for the New York Police Department.

Jules and Gédéon Naudet are the French filmmakers who were at the scene of the attack as they were filming a documentary on members of the Engine 7, Ladder 1 firehouse in Lower Manhattan and had followed the fire fighters on a routine call following a suspected gas leak in downtown New York. Upon hearing a plane pass overhead, Jules Naudet swung the camera to track it and filmed the collision by chance. He continued to film during the attack and evacuation, gathering some 180 hours of footage. The brothers, by their own admission made an effort to not film any of those who died while they were at the site via either fire, jumping or other traumatic injuries.

Some individuals tied to news stations, such as photojournalist Mark LaGanga, who works for CBS News, were called up by editors and executives and told to document the event. In the case of LaGanga, it was thought to be just a small plane crash, and he did not fully understand the true nature of the attack while he documented and interviewed passing first responders, until he documented the collapse of the North Tower. Other videos of the attack were taken by individuals who did not make the footage public immediately, such as former New York University student Caroline Dries, who filmed the attack out of her 32nd floor room on Water Street and held on to the footage for almost 10 years. After releasing the footage, she stated that it took her ten years to understand why the footage was special, and that sometimes it would have been nice or easier to not have filmed it, and just to have run away.

Television channels 

Due to the reactive reporting of the attacks, many television journalists and their production teams were scrambling for information and reporting live from close locations to the attacks as possible. This allowed them to capture the real-time reactions of ordinary citizens, first responders, and political leaders as the events were unfolding, causing much of the verbal content aired to the public to be spontaneous and emotionally charged. Even later shows such as The Late Show with David Letterman showcased the emotional reactions to the attacks, rather than a potential narrative. Many channels devoted 24 hour-7 days a week coverage to the attacks, as the magnitude of the damage was assessed, the potential for more attacks subsided, and important revelations into the roles of Osama bin Laden and al-Qaida became known.

Channels such as WNYW, on its Good Day New York program, aired footage almost immediately, and CNN had a live feed of the Twin Towers at 8:49 AM, almost three minutes after the first plane had hit. Other channels used news channel coverage in order to spread information, with VH1 and MTV utilizing CBS's material, and ESPN and ESPN2 utilizing ABC's material. At the end of the night, Nielsen estimated that at least 80 million Americans watched the evening news, while an estimate by the University of Georgia held that about two billion people either watched the attacks in real time or through the news.

The satellite feed of one television station, WPIX, froze on the last image received from the WTC mast; the image (a remote-camera shot of the burning towers), viewable across North America (as WPIX is available on cable TV in many areas), remained on the screen for much of the day until WPIX was able to set up alternate transmission facilities. It shows the WTC at the moment power cut off to the WPIX transmitter, prior to the towers' collapse.

A little more than a week after the attacks, a Pew Research Center report showed that 89% of Americans polled gave the media a positive rating for the reports on the attacks and 90% of respondents received news about the attacks via the television. Review of the reported material by cable news stations found that during the first five hours of live coverage rumors and/or speculation was reported eighty-four times, with retraction statements as information became more available seen multiple times through the day.

Telecommunication devices

Phones 
While the phone networks were crucial during the attacks to document what was happening and gain information for either victims, family and friends or first responders, they were also battered by the attacks. Verizon's densest knot of cables and switches in the world were located near the trade center, with the attack destroying 300,000 voice access lines, and 4.5 million data circuits with 10 cellular towers made inactive. This caused 14,000 businesses and 20,000 residential customers to lose service.

Cell phones 
During the September 11 attacks, cell phone technology was still being developed, and the capabilities of the technology themselves were limited. Relatively few cell phones could record and transmit still images and video. However, many scholars found that the growing adoption of cell phones allowed for the creation of spontaneous networks of communication that circumvented more centralized systems of communication. Most of the material created by cell phones was voicemail messages. Many of the voicemail records were included by individuals documenting the disaster and in archives about the reactions of the victims and survivors. The director of the September 11 Digital Archive Tom Scheinfeldt stated in an April 2008 interview; 
Others were able to reach members of their families either before, during or after the attacks. At least one individual who had experienced the 1993 bombing called her mother and urged her to turn on the television while she spoke to her about the conditions in the tower she was in and told her mother goodbye. A survivor noted at a later time that many of those he saw near ground zero often held cell-phones and were emotional at their inability to reach potential victims in the towers. Another who was evacuating with others in his building found that their network was jammed, and reported that when attempting to call only one out of twenty dials would get through. Loss of phone lines did not prevent survivors trapped in the rubble of the buildings from calling officials or family members during rescue efforts with their cell phones.

Pay phones 
Throughout Washington D.C. and New York City, coin-operated pay phones on the street and near businesses became a vital link in communication and passing information.

Pagers 
As the attacks occurred during a transfer period of technology, many of the victims used pagers instead of cell phones to communicate with friends and family. Some of these messages were obtained by Wikileaks and published in 2009, although the validity of the messages cannot be fully confirmed. Of these messages, analysis has shown that the phrase "plane has crashed" was used most often at about 9 AM, along with "unconfirmed reports". Throughout the entire day and attack, the four most consistent phrases throughout were "please call home", "call me ASAP", "call your mother" and "call your wife". One survivor who had been eating in the cafeteria on the 43rd floor of the North Tower, reported she received a bulletin on her pager announcing that a plane had hit the World Trade Center.

Airplane radios, intercoms, and air-phones 
The hijackers of the airplanes did not know how to operate the planes' radio and intercom systems, so some of their comments were inadvertently sent to air traffic controllers. These comments, coupled with stewardesses who were able to operate the air-phone, meant that officials were able to document the attackers' movements on the planes.

References 

September 11 attacks
2000s photographs